Twelve ships of the French Navy have borne the name Licorne, the French word for Unicorn:

Ships named Licorne 
 , a fluyt captured from Holland 
 , a fireship 
 , an 8-gun fluyt 
 , a 52-gun ship of the line 
 , a 32-gun frigate, lead ship of her class.
 , a 20-gun corvette, formerly , that  captured in 1780.  recaptured her off Cape Blaise in 1781 and the Royal Navy took her back into service as Unicorn Prize. She was broken up in 1787. 
 , a fluyt, formerly the Indiaman Lambert 
 , a transport 
 , a fluyt, lead ship of her class 
 , a transport 
 , a tug. 
 , a Diver propulsion vehicle.

Ships with similar names 
 , an auxiliary patrol boat.

Fictional ships 
 , a fictional sailing ship of the French Royal Navy in the French-language Belgian comic book Tintin

See also

Notes and references
Notes

References

Bibliography
 
 

French Navy ship names